Fascioloides is a genus of flatworm.

Species
Fascioloides jacksoni (Cobbold, 1869)
Fascioloides magna (Bassi, 1875)

References

Digenea genera
Plagiorchiida